The 1981 Western Michigan Broncos football team represented Western Michigan University in the Mid-American Conference (MAC) during the 1981 NCAA Division I-A football season.  In their seventh and final season under head coach Elliot Uzelac, the Broncos compiled a 6–5 record (5–4 against MAC opponents), finished in a tie for fifth place in the MAC, and outscored their opponents, 206 to 170.  The team played its home games at Waldo Stadium in Kalamazoo, Michigan.

The team's statistical leaders included Tom George with 1,419 passing yards, Shawn Faulkner with 701 rushing yards, and Bob Phillips with 809 receiving yards. Reggie Hinton and linebacker John Schuster were the team captains. Split end Bob Phillips received the team's most outstanding player award.

On November 24, 1981, coach Uzelac was fired as the Broncos' head football coach. Athletic director Tom Wonderling said at the time: "The program has progressed tremendously under Elliot, but I think at the present time we need a change."  Wonderling was also critical of Uzelac's conservative offense, saying: "We're not like the Big Ten; we have to have something more." In seven years at Western, Uzelac compiled a 38–39 record.

Schedule

References

Western Michigan
Western Michigan Broncos football seasons
Western Michigan Broncos football